Violin is a 2011 Malayalam language musical romance film directed by Sibi Malayil. It stars Asif Ali and Nithya Menon in the lead roles, and Vijayaraghavan, Nedumudi Venu, Sreejith Ravi, Chembil Ashokan, Lakshmy Ramakrishnan and Reena Basheer in other major roles. The film is about two youngsters who are brought together by their fondness to music. A musical romance film by genre, it features music composed by Bijibal and a song composed by Bollywood composer Anand Raj Anand. Rafeeq Ahmed writes the lyrics while Manoj Pillai is the cinematographer. Sakhi Thomas was the costume designer for this movie. Having filmed the major parts from Fort Kochi, the film released on 1 July 2011.
Violin Dubbed to Telugu As Dilse in 2012.

Plot 
The lives of Angel and her two aunts Annie and Mercy are transformed, when Aby walks in, as their tenant. After a bout of initial resistance from Angel, romance strikes, and the two fall in sincere love.

Cast 
 Asif Ali as Aby
 Nithya Menon as Angel
 Lakshmi Ramakrishnan as Annie
 Reena Basheer as Mercy
 Vijayaraghavan as Simon
 Nedumudi Venu as doctor
 Abhishek Raveendran as Jose
 Chembil Asokan
 Sreejith Ravi as Henry
 Vijay Menon as Aby's father
 Neena Kurup as rose

Soundtrack 
The soundtrack of this movie was composed by Bijibal and Anand Raj Anand, with lyrics by Rafeeq Ahmed and Santhosh Varma.

References

External links

Further reading 
 
 

2010s Malayalam-language films
2010s romantic musical films
Indian romantic musical films
Films directed by Sibi Malayil
Films scored by Anand Raj Anand